El Barrito is a corregimiento in Atalaya District, Veraguas Province, Panama with a population of 899 as of 2010. Its population as of 1990 was 926; its population as of 2000 was 856.

References

Corregimientos of Veraguas Province